Joe Peschisolido (born April 27, 1963) is a Canadian lawyer and politician who served as the Member of Parliament (MP) for the riding of Richmond from 2000 to 2004 and as the MP for Steveston—Richmond East from 2015 to 2019. He was first elected as a member of the Canadian Alliance, but crossed the floor to the Liberal Party in 2002.

Background
Peschisolido has a Bachelor of Arts (honours) degree in political science from Trinity College at the University of Toronto and a law degree from Osgoode Hall Law School. Peschisolido is a fourth degree knight of the Knights of Columbus in Richmond, a member of the Rotary Club of Richmond Sunset and a member of the Richmond Chamber of Commerce. He is an active parishioner of Canadian Martyrs Catholic Church and is a vegan, who believes in making healthy and sustainable food choices.

Political career
For decades, Peschisolido was a member of the Liberal Party, where he had worked as a youth co-ordinator for Jean Chrétien's 1990 leadership campaign. In 1993, he joined the Reform Party of Canada (later the Canadian Alliance), running as their candidate in Etobicoke North in the 1993 general election and a subsequent 1996 by-election. He placed second both times.

First term (2000 to 2004)
Peschisolido relocated to British Columbia, where he was elected as Member of Parliament for Richmond in the 2000 general election, defeating Liberal incumbent, Raymond Chan.

In 2002, Peschisolido left the Canadian Alliance and crossed the floor to the Liberal Party without consulting with his constituents. This was due to the "process of political realignment" which eliminated both the Canadian Alliance and the Progressive Conservative Party, and instead creating the Conservative Party of Canada.

While serving in office, Peschisolido fought to protect the rights of taxpayers by introducing the "Taxpayers' Bill of Rights" in the 37th Parliament's first, second, and third sessions.

In 2002, Peschisolido helped broker the original Garden City land deal, which saw the transfer of said lands from the Canadian federal government to the City of Richmond. This deal would have seen the City of Richmond receive 75 to 80 percent of the land, with the rest of the property set aside for a trade and exhibition center, as well as commercial development.

In 2003, he served as Parliamentary Secretary to the President of the Queen's Privy Council for Canada and Minister of Intergovernmental Affairs.  He was also Vice-Chair for the Standing Committee on Human Resources Development and the Status of Persons with Disabilities.

Peschisolido lost the Liberal nomination to his predecessor as Member of Parliament, Raymond Chan, who went on to retain the riding for the Liberals in the 2004 election.

2011 election

In 2011, Peschisolido won the Liberal nomination over Raymond Chan for Member of Parliament for Richmond in the 2011 Canadian federal election. In the general election, Peschisolido was defeated by Alice Wong by more than 17,000 votes.

Second term (2015 to 2019)

On August 11, 2015, Peschisolido again won the Liberal nomination for Member of Parliament in the new riding of Steveston—Richmond East for the 2015 Canadian federal election.

On October 19, 2015, as a Liberal majority government was formed, Peschisolido was returned to Parliament.

In July 2019, Global News reported the Royal Canadian Mounted Police opened an investigation into Peschisolido "after confidential police informants alleged the veteran politician had been knowingly associating with Chinese organized crime figures through his former real estate law practice in Richmond, B.C." Peschisolido's law firm allegedly received money via illicit channels from China as part of an attempt by the firm's clients to circumvent the legal immigration process. No charges have been laid against Peschisolido or lawyers at his firm. Peschisolido turned in his law license in 2018.

On February 5, 2020 the Ethics Commissioner of Canada released an investigative report on Peschisolido. The Commissioner found Peschisolido contravened subsections 21(3) and 20(1) of the Conflict of Interest Code for Members of the House of Commons for failing to file a statement of material change and by failing to file a full statement of the private interests.

Peschisolido was defeated by Kenny Chiu in the 2019 Canadian federal election, and Parliament could not apply sanctions since Peschisolido was no longer a sitting MP.

Electoral record

References

External links
 

1963 births
Living people
Canadian Alliance MPs
Canadian people of Italian descent
Liberal Party of Canada MPs
Members of the House of Commons of Canada from British Columbia
People from Richmond, British Columbia
Politicians from Toronto
Trinity College (Canada) alumni
University of Toronto alumni
Osgoode Hall Law School alumni
Lawyers in British Columbia
Lawyers in Ontario
21st-century Canadian politicians